Inaye thedi is a 1981 Indian Malayalam-language film, directed and produced by Antony Eastman in his directorial debut. The film stars Kalasala Babu, Sankaradi, Achankunju and Silk Smitha. The film has musical score by Johnson.

Cast
Kalasala Babu
Sankaradi
Achankunju
Silk Smitha
T. M. Abraham

Production 
Antony Eastman initially wanted to cast Shoba as the lead actress; following her death, he instead chose Silk Smitha.

Soundtrack
The music was composed by Johnson and the lyrics were written by R. K. Damodaran.

References

External links
 

1981 films
1980s Malayalam-language films
1981 directorial debut films